Ascanio Ferrari was a Roman Catholic prelate who served as Bishop of Montepeloso (1548–1550).

Biography
On 24 February 1548, Ascanio Ferrari was appointed during the papacy of Pope Paul III as Bishop of Montepeloso. He served as Bishop of Montepeloso until his resignation in 1550.

Episcopal succession
While bishop, he was the principal co-consecrator of:

References

External links and additional sources
 (Chronology of Bishops) 
 (Chronology of Bishops) 

16th-century Italian Roman Catholic bishops
Bishops appointed by Pope Paul III